Jairo Johan Ortiz Bustamante (2 September 1997-6 April 2017) was a Venezuelan student. Ortiz was the first person killed during the 2017 protests in Venezuela.

Killing 
Jairo Ortiz was a student at the Universidad Experimental Politécnica (UNEXPO) in Caracas. On 6 April 2017, he was shot while participating in a demonstration held in Carrizal, in Miranda state, dying at the age of 19. The independent investigation carried out by the Public Ministry determined that the shots were fired by a Bolivarian National Police official, Rohenluis Leonel Rojas Mara, who drew his regulation weapon and fired multiple shots at a group of 81 young people, despite the constitutional rule that prohibits the use of firearms to control demonstrations.

The killing of Jairo Ortiz was documented in a report by a panel of independent experts from the Organization of American States, considering that it could constitute a crime against humanity committed in Venezuela along with other killings during the protests.

See also 

 Armando Cañizales
 Miguel Castillo
 Neomar Lander
 Paúl Moreno
 Juan Pablo Pernalete
 Paola Ramírez
 Xiomara Scott
 Fabián Urbina
 David Vallenilla
 Timeline of the 2017 Venezuelan protests

References 

People shot dead by law enforcement officers
Victims of police brutality
People murdered in Venezuela
1997 births
2017 deaths
2017 murders in Venezuela